Tabernaemontana gamblei is a species of plant in the family Apocynaceae. It is endemic to India.

References

gamblei
Endemic flora of India (region)
Conservation dependent plants
Near threatened flora of Asia
Taxonomy articles created by Polbot